Matt McCoy is a songwriter, worship leader and a Christian musician. His first studio album "Raise the Flag Again" was released in March 2008 and was produced by Vineyard Music producer, Robbie Reider. In 2010, Matt's second studio album "Heaven Calling" was released featuring 13 original songs. On December 31, 2012, Matt recorded "Shine (Live)" in downtown Indianapolis with over 3,000 Campus Crusade college students.  Born and raised in San Diego, California, Matt now resides in Chicago, IL and has since been on staff as a worship leader at Willow Creek Community Church and Harvest Bible Chapel. He is also the founder of LoopCommunity.com (known as Loop Community), an online resource for worship leaders and musicians for worship loops, multitracks, and the use of technology in worship. In September 2011, he became an Ableton Certified Trainer and travels the country teaching worship leaders and musicians how to use loops and multitracks in live worship and performance.

Discography 

Vineyard Music Group:

It's Your Kindness on Club 62 (2007)
One Thing I Ask on Club 63 (2008)

Solo Albums:

"Alive and Free (Live)" (2015)
"Shine (Live)" (2012)
"Connect LIVE: Forever Reign (Live)" (2011)
"Connect LIVE: Your Love Never Fails (Live)" (2010)
"Heaven Calling" (2010)
"Raise the Flag Again" (2008)
Revelation Generation (2007)
Walking It Out (2006)
Arise EP (2006)
Live from Syracuse Vineyard (2003)

External links 
Matt McCoy Official Website

Living people
Christian music songwriters
American performers of Christian music
Year of birth missing (living people)